Simon Davies (born 6 December 1963) is an English designer, interior decorator and television presenter working in Sweden.

He works with his partner Tomas Cederlund.

Television shows
Roomservice - Kanal 5
Från koja till slott - TV 3
Design: Simon och Tomas - TV 3

References 

Living people
English television presenters
English LGBT people
Swedish LGBT people
1963 births
English interior designers
English businesspeople